is a Japanese corporation specializing in the manufacture and sales of electrical connectors such as high speed LVDS, HDMI, PCI express, high density, micro coaxial, automotive, and board to board connectors. It also makes systems equipment  and aerospace products. With headquarters in Shibuya, Tokyo, JAE is listed on the first section of the Tokyo Stock Exchange. The company has a capital of 10.69 billion yen and had net sales of 222.1 billion yen (consolidated) from April 1, 2018 to the year ended March 31, 2019, employing 6,255 people worldwide. The largest stockholder is NEC, with 24.53%.
 
A major Japanese defense contractor, Japan Aviation Electronics was convicted of illegally selling sensitive U.S. military technology to Iran in 1992, was fined and stripped of the use of U.S. export licenses for up to three years.

Establishment

Awards
JAN. 2009 JAE among with other nine companies were given a Technology and Engineering Emmy Award for their development of HDMI by the National Academy of Television Arts and Sciences (NATAS) on January 7, 2009. 

MAR. 2009 JAE was awarded "Medal with Dark Blue Ribbon" from the Government of Japan.

DEC. 2011 JAE received "2011 Top 100 Global Innovators Award" from Thomson Reuters.

Globalization timeline

Connector product lines

Aerospace products

References

Sources
Braaaa

External links
Japan Aviation Electronics Industry,Limited (in English)

Companies listed on the Tokyo Stock Exchange
Electronics companies of Japan
NEC subsidiaries
Defense companies of Japan